The Loves of Rocambole (French: Les amours de Rocambole) is a 1924 French silent film directed by Charles Maudru and starring Maurice Thorèze, Claude Mérelle and Albert Decoeur.

Cast

References

Bibliography
 Philippe Rège. Encyclopedia of French Film Directors, Volume 1. Scarecrow Press, 2009.

External links

1924 films
Films directed by Charles Maudru
French silent films
French black-and-white films
1920s French films